The Huichuan Sports Centre is a sports complex in Huichuan District, Zunyi, Guizhou, China. It was completed in September 2001 with an investment of 200 million yuan. The sports center includes a multi-purpose stadium named Huichuan Stadium with a seating capacity of 26,000, which is the second largest sports venue in Guizhou Province after the Guiyang Olympic Sports Center. It also has an indoor stadium with basketball, badminton, table tennis courts and a swimming pool. The Zunyi Citizens' Sports Center, built in 2010, is also part of the complex.

References

Football venues in China
Multi-purpose stadiums in China
Zunyi
2001 establishments in China
Sports venues completed in 2001
Sports venues in Guizhou